Shashi Ranjan (born 29 September) is an Indian actor who works predominantly in Bollywood and television industry. He began his acting career at a young age in his native town Madhubani. After acting in a number of plays in theatres in Delhi, Shashi Ranjan made his debut as parallel lead in daily soap Tere Mere Sapne for Star Plus in 2009. Shashi is known for his roles 'Pantar' in The Legend of Michael Mishra and 'Ramesh' in Tumhari Sulu.

Early life

Shashi Ranjan was born in Sitamarhi on 29 September 1957. His father is a clerk in the district collectorate office in Madhubani. He began his acting career in his hometown Madhubani at a very young age in his school days. Later he shifted to the national capital Delhi and started to act regularly in plays directed by some of the renowned directors of the country.

Acting career

After shifting to the national capital Shashi acted in number of plays directed by the versatile theatre personalities of the country such as Mohan Maharishi, Late Prem Matiyani, Satish Anand, Avtar Sahni, K.S. Rajendran, Rudradeep Chakraborty, Prakash Jha, Suresh Anagalli, Santosh Rana, Kamlanand Vibhuti, Nilesh deepak, etc. He also used to conduct theatre workshops and directed a few plays for several Delhi theatre houses before he shifted to Mumbai. After shifting his base to Mumbai he has appeared in more than eighty commercial ads which included brands such as Dabur Hajmola, Centre Fresh Paan, Radio Mirchi, Dominos Pizza, Birla Sunlife, Sony promo, IPL ad, &TV promo, Bigg Boss 12 promo, Set ax promo, Black Cobra plywood etc. His first role in a daily soap opera came in the year 2009 when he did the parallel lead in Tere Mere Sapne for Star Plus.

Partial filmography

The Legend of Michael Mishra
Tumhari Sulu
  Lootcase as Abdul
 Yahan Sabhi Gyani Hain
 “Bike My Life”
Jilla Top
Tarengan”Tere Mere SapneHum Saaf Saaf Hai (TV series)

References

1985 births
Living people